The Garfield Show is a CGI animated television series produced by Dargaud Media and Paws, Inc.. It is based on the American Garfield comic strip created by Jim Davis. The animated series focuses on a new series of adventures for the characters of Garfield, Odie, and their owner Jon Arbuckle, alongside staple characters from the strip and a number of unique additions for the program. Both Davis and producer Mark Evanier, who previously wrote episodes for the 1988 animated series Garfield and Friends, co-wrote stories for the program, with the cast including Frank Welker, Wally Wingert, Julie Payne, Jason Marsden and Gregg Berger. Welker and Berger had previously voiced various characters in Garfield and Friends.

The animated series premiered on 22 December 2008 in France as Garfield & Cie and on 2 November 2009 in the United States. It ran for five seasons, with its last episode airing in America on 24 October 2016; Evanier stated shortly afterward that it was on hiatus. On 6 August 2019, an untitled Nickelodeon series based on the Garfield comic strip was announced, seemingly ending any chances of The Garfield Show coming back.

Plot 
The show features loose continuity and is set in a different universe to the previous Garfield cartoon series Garfield and Friends, which is occasionally referenced. Unlike the previous show, Liz is now considered a main character and has an official relationship with Jon to reflect their current status in the comic strip. The Garfield Show also reestablishes Arlene as Garfield's potential love interest, as in the comic strip, replacing Penelope from the previous show (despite being advertised as a main character, her actual role in the series is minor). In addition, unlike the previous series and animated specials, where Garfield thought instead of vocalized his dialogue, Garfield is now a talking character. Nevertheless, only other animals are usually able to understand him; Jon and other humans sometimes can.

The Garfield Show also features many new characters that are part of the regular cast, such as Vito, an Italian chef whose cooking Garfield enjoys, and Harry, a stray cat who acts as both a friend and a nemesis to Garfield. Squeak, Garfield's mouse friend that lives in Jon's house, appeared in the comic strip; he replaces Floyd from the previous show. Unlike Garfield and Friends, the U.S. Acres  cast do not feature.

Episodes

Characters

Cast 
 Frank Welker - Garfield, Eddie Gourmand, Mr. Arbuckle, Nimbus, Spumomi, Ricotta
 Gregg Berger - Odie, Squeak, Harry, Herman Post, Mama Meanie, General Gorgonzola, Jim Davis, Buckley, Mr. Barker
 Wally Wingert - Jon Arbuckle, Al the Dog Catcher, Irv, The Lasagna King, Hercules, Charley
 Jason Marsden - Nermal, Vito Cappelletti, Mr. Wilson, Pete the Dog Catcher, Professor Bonkers, Humphrey, Gnarley
 Audrey Wasilewski - Arlene, Gloria, Newscaster
 Julie Payne - Dr. Liz Wilson, Mrs. Wilson, Mrs. Arbuckle

Additional  
 Joe Alaskey - Farley, The Sandman
 Bob Bergen - Health Inspector
 Corey Burton - Cousin Ratzo
 Frank Buxton
 Grey DeLisle - Jack Allwork, Sandra
 Melissa Disney - Nathan
 Bill Farmer - McCuckoo
 Frank Ferrante - Lyman
 June Foray - Mrs. Cauldron
 Stan Freberg - Dr. Whipple, Fluffykins, Mole, Spencer Spendington, Hippo
 Brooks Gardner
 Hank Garrett
 Mark Hamill - Master Control
 Laraine Newman - Aunt Ivy, News Anchorwoman, Winona, Angelica, Bella Bellissima, Tyham, Aunt Esther, Queen Tania, Abigail
 Maurice LaMarche - Samuel W. Underburger
 Phil LaMarr  - Armstrong
 David Lander - Doc Boy Arbuckle
 Misty Lee - Angie, Scheherazade
 Tress MacNeille - Esmeralda Brubaker, Hostess, Squirrel #1
 Rose Marie - Varicella
 Diane Michelle
 Candi Milo - Lester, Chester, Reporter, Squirrel #2, Celeste, Mary Margaret
 Chuck McCann - Mayor Graffton
 Marvin Kaplan - Hiram “Hi” Pressure
 Jack Riley - Anthony Allwork, Ghost Cat
 Neil Ross - King Glorm, Tyler Edge, Brandon Scoop
 Jewel Shepard - Officer Reed
 Susan Silo - Neferkitty, Metalla
 Laura Summer - Drusilla & Minerva, Lucerita & Tabitha
 Fred Tatasciore - Biff, Dirk Dinkum
 Scott Whyte
 April Winchell - Ms. Gourmand

Development 
The Garfield Show is a CGI series that started development in 2007 to coincide with the strip's 30th anniversary the following year premiering in France the following year.

Following the previous animated series of Garfield that debuted in 1988, many of the crew members would return to work on The Garfield Show.

Broadcast 
The series premiered in France on France 3 on 22 December 2008.

English-language episodes started airing on Boomerang UK on 5 May 2009.

English-Language episodes started airing on Boomerang (Middle East and Africa) and on Boomerang (Central and Eastern Europe) on 7 November 2009.

It aired on YTV in Canada from 13 September 2009 to 30 December 2011.

In the United States, it aired on Cartoon Network from 2 November 2009 to 30 May 2014. It also aired on Boomerang from 4 February 2013 to 30 December 2016.

In Bangladesh, the series aired on Duronto TV from 12 January 2020.

Home media

Reception 
The Garfield Show has received mixed-to-negative reviews. Common Sense Media gave the show 3 stars out of 5, saying "Infamous cat's antics are fun, if not exactly message laden."

Kevin Carr of 7M pictures gave the show 2 stars out of 5 stating that the animation felt unpolished compared to the direct-to-video movies and that the show was full of "throwaway stories" because it "aims for a more kid-friendly presentation of the fat feline." He concluded his review stating he preferred "old-school cell animation as the week-to-week series CGI looks too much like cheap video game emulations, but I’m not the target market of these things".

Justin Felix of DVD talk gave the show 2.5 out of 5 stating that "The Garfield Show isn't some great work of art, but it efficiently delivers cartoon animal fun that little kids would probably enjoy. The animation is a tad rudimentary and clunky at times, but it's good enough to pass muster for cartoon fare of this type."

Mike Gencarelli of Media Mikes gave the show 3.5 out of 5 stating "it doesn’t compare to the classic Jim Davis cartoon but it is all we have right now."
 
The series has a 6.0 user score on Metacritic indicating mixed reviews.

Video game 
The Garfield Show: Threat of the Space Lasagna, a party video game, was released in July 2010 for the Wii. It includes over 12 minigames and supports the Wii Balance Board and Wii Motion Plus. The game was critically panned for its short length, lack of interactivity and monotonous gameplay.

See also 
 List of French animated television series
 List of French television series
 Garfield and Friends
 Garfield Originals

Notes

References

External links 
 
 

2008 French television series debuts
2000s French animated television series
2010s French animated television series
2009 American television series debuts
2016 American television series endings
2000s American animated television series
2010s American animated television series
American animated television spin-offs
American children's animated adventure television series
American children's animated comedy television series
American computer-animated television series
Animated television series about cats
Animated television series about dogs
English-language television shows
French-language television shows
French animated television spin-offs
French children's animated adventure television series
French children's animated comedy television series
French computer-animated television series
Television shows based on comic strips
Television shows set in Indiana
France Télévisions children's television series
France Télévisions television comedy
Garfield